Pauliasi "Paul" Fanaika (born April 9, 1986) is a former American football offensive guard. He was drafted by the Philadelphia Eagles in the seventh round of the 2009 NFL Draft. He played college football at Arizona State.

Fanaika has been a member of the Washington Redskins, Cleveland Browns, Seattle Seahawks, Arizona Cardinals and Kansas City Chiefs.

Early years
Fanaika attended Mills High School in Millbrae, California.

Professional career

Philadelphia Eagles

Fanaika was drafted by the Philadelphia Eagles in the seventh round of the 2009 NFL Draft. He was waived on September 5, 2009. He was re-signed to their practice squad on September 6, 2009.

Washington Redskins
Fanaika was signed off the Eagles practice squad on November 23 by the Washington Redskins. He was waived on June 14, 2010.

Cleveland Browns
Fanaika was claimed off waivers by the Cleveland Browns on June 15, 2010 but released on September 4, 2010 before the season started. One day later, he signed with the Browns' practice squad.

Seattle Seahawks
Fanaika was signed off the Cleveland Browns' practice squad on December 14, 2010 by the Seattle Seahawks.

Arizona Cardinals
Fanaika signed with the Arizona Cardinals on April 24, 2013, and started all 16 games that season.

Kansas City Chiefs
Fanaika signed a $8.1 million, three-year contract with the Kansas City Chiefs on March 11, 2015. 

On April 26, 2016, the Chiefs released Fanaika.

Personal life
Has a cousin Jason Fanaika went to Utah State and then transferred to Utah. He played one season with the San Francisco 49ers and Pittsburgh Steelers in the NFL before retiring.

References

External links
Seattle Seahawks bio 
Philadelphia Eagles bio 
Arizona State Sun Devils bio 

American football offensive guards
Players of American football from California
1986 births
Living people
American people of Tongan descent
Arizona State Sun Devils football players
Philadelphia Eagles players
Washington Redskins players
Cleveland Browns players
Seattle Seahawks players
Arizona Cardinals players
Kansas City Chiefs players
People from Millbrae, California
People from San Mateo, California
Sportspeople from the San Francisco Bay Area